Deiby Aldair Flores (born 16 June 1996) is a Honduran professional footballer who plays as a defensive midfielder for Nemzeti Bajnokság I club Fehérvár and the Honduras national team.

Career
Born in San Pedro Sula, Flores made his debut for F.C. Motagua in the Liga Nacional de Fútbol Profesional de Honduras on 12 January 2014, coming on as a substitute for Irvin Reyna in a 1–0 away win against Deportes Savio.

On 24 February 2015, Flores joined Major League Soccer club Vancouver Whitecaps FC on a one-year loan with a transfer option. He made is debut on 28 March 2015, coming off the bench for Gershon Koffie against the Portland Timbers in a 2–1 home win. On 18 January 2016, Vancouver signed Flores from Motagua on a multi-year contract after making his loan move permanent.

On 9 August 2016, Flores returned to Motagua on a temporary loan deal until 31 December 2016. The following 12 July, he was loaned to Motagua again, this time until 30 June 2018.

On 2 July 2018, Flores was waived by Vancouver.

References

External links
 Whitecaps FC Profile
 

1996 births
Living people
Honduran footballers
Honduras international footballers
F.C. Motagua players
Vancouver Whitecaps FC players
Whitecaps FC 2 players
C.D. Olimpia players
Panetolikos F.C. players
Association football midfielders
Liga Nacional de Fútbol Profesional de Honduras players
Major League Soccer players
USL Championship players
Super League Greece players
2015 CONCACAF U-20 Championship players
People from San Pedro Sula
Honduran expatriate footballers
Expatriate soccer players in Canada
Honduran expatriate sportspeople in Canada
Expatriate soccer players in the United States
Honduran expatriate sportspeople in the United States
Expatriate footballers in Greece
Honduran expatriate sportspeople in Greece
2021 CONCACAF Gold Cup players